The second moment of area, or second area moment, or quadratic moment of area and also known as the area moment of inertia, is a geometrical property of an area which reflects how its points are distributed with regard to an arbitrary axis. In both cases, it is calculated with a multiple integral over the object in question. Its dimension is L (length) to the fourth power. Its unit of dimension, when working with the International System of Units, is meters to the fourth power, m4, or inches to the fourth power, in4, when working in the Imperial System of Units.

In structural engineering, the second moment of area of a beam is an important property used in the calculation of the beam's deflection and the calculation of stress caused by a moment applied to the beam. In order to maximize the second moment of area, a large fraction of the cross-sectional area of an I-beam is located at the maximum possible distance from the centroid of the I-beam's cross-section. The planar second moment of area provides insight into a beam's resistance to bending due to an applied moment, force, or distributed load perpendicular to its neutral axis, as a function of its shape. The polar second moment of area provides insight into a beam's resistance to torsional deflection, due to an applied moment parallel to its cross-section, as a function of its shape.

Different disciplines use the term moment of inertia (MOI) to refer to different moments. In each case the integral is over all the infinitesimal elements of area, dA, in some two-dimensional cross-section. In physics, moment of inertia is strictly the second moment of mass with respect to distance from an axis: , where r is the distance to some potential rotation axis, and the integral is over all the infinitesimal elements of mass, dm, in a three-dimensional space occupied by an object . The MOI, in this sense, is the analog of mass for rotational problems. In engineering (especially mechanical and civil), moment of inertia commonly refers to the second moment of the area.

Definition

The second moment of area for an arbitrary shape  with respect to an arbitrary axis  is defined as

where
  is the  infinitesimal area element, and
  is the perpendicular distance from the axis .

For example, when the desired reference axis is the x-axis, the second moment of area  (often denoted as ) can be computed in Cartesian coordinates as

The second moment of the area is crucial in Euler–Bernoulli theory of slender beams.

Product moment of area 
More generally, the product moment of area is defined as

Parallel axis theorem 

It is sometimes necessary to calculate the second moment of area of a shape with respect to an  axis different to the centroidal axis of the shape. However, it is often easier to derive the second moment of area with respect to its centroidal axis, and use the parallel axis theorem to derive the second moment of area with respect to the  axis. The parallel axis theorem states

where
  is the area of the shape, and

A similar statement can be made about a  axis and the parallel centroidal  axis. Or, in general, any centroidal  axis and a parallel  axis.

Perpendicular axis theorem 

For the simplicity of calculation, it is often desired to define the polar moment of area  (with respect to a perpendicular axis) in terms of two area moments of inertia (both with respect to in-plane axes).

Composite shapes 
For more complex areas, it is often easier to divide the area into a series of "simpler" shapes. The second moment of area for the entire shape is the sum of the second moment of areas of all of its parts about a common axis. This can include shapes that are "missing" (i.e. holes, hollow shapes, etc.), in which case the second moment of area of the "missing" areas are subtracted, rather than added. In other words, the second moment of area of "missing" parts are considered negative for the method of composite shapes.

Examples
See list of second moments of area for other shapes.

Rectangle with centroid at the origin

Consider a rectangle with base  and height  whose centroid is located at the origin.  represents the second moment of area with respect to the x-axis;  represents the second moment of area with respect to the y-axis;  represents the polar moment of inertia with respect to the z-axis.

Annulus centered at origin

Because of the symmetry of the annulus, the centroid also lies at the origin. We can determine the polar moment of inertia, about the  axis by the method of composite shapes. This polar moment of inertia is equivalent to the polar moment of inertia of a circle with radius  minus the polar moment of inertia of a circle with radius , both centered at the origin. First, let us derive the polar moment of inertia of a circle with radius  with respect to the origin. Instead of obtaining the second moment of area from Cartesian coordinates as done in the previous section, we shall calculate  and  directly using polar coordinates.

Now, the polar moment of inertia about the  axis for an annulus is simply, as stated above, the difference of the second moments of area of a circle with radius  and a circle with radius .

Alternatively, we could change the limits on the  integral the first time around to reflect the fact that there is a hole.  This would be done like this.

Any polygon

The second moment of area about the origin for any simple polygon on the XY-plane can be computed in general by summing contributions from each segment of the polygon after dividing the area into a set of triangles. This formula is related to the shoelace formula and can be considered a special case of Green's theorem.

A polygon is assumed to have  vertices, numbered in counter-clockwise fashion. If polygon vertices are numbered clockwise, returned values will be negative, but absolute values will be correct.

See also
 List of second moments of area
 List of moments of inertia
 Moment of inertia
 Parallel axis theorem
 Perpendicular axis theorem
 Radius of gyration

References

Geometry
Structural analysis
Physical quantities
Moment (physics)